The AGA City League is an American Go Association (AGA) go tournament in which teams from various cities compete against each other in a league system, on the Pandanet server in the "AGA City League" room.

The teams consist of up to five players, of whom three are selected to play in each round.

The current rules are listed on Pandanet.

AGA City League A 2013
The matches took place across 4 divisions (A to D), in the first half of 2013.

Round 1
January 26, 2013

Round 2
February 24, 2013

Round 3
March 17, 2013

Round 4
March 31, 2013

Round 5
April 28, 2013

Round 6
May 12, 2013

Round 7
May 26, 2013

Round 8
June 16, 2013

Round 9
June 30, 2013

Round 10
July 14, 2013

Final Rank

AGA City League A 2014
The matches took place across 3 divisions (A to C), in the first half of 2014.

Round 1 
January 25, 2014

Round 2
February 22, 2014

Round 3
March 29, 2014

Round 4
April 26, 2014

Round 5
May 17, 2014

Final Rank

AGA City League A 2015
The matches took place across 3 divisions (A to C), between November 23, 2014, and April 26, 2015.

Round 1 
November 23, 2014

Round 2 
January 25, 2015

Round 3 
February 22, 2015

Round 4 
March 29, 2015

Round 5 
April 26, 2015

Final Rank

AGA City League A 2016
The matches took place across 3 divisions (A to C), between October 18, 2015, and May 22, 2016.

Round 1 
October 18, 2015

Round 2 
November 15, 2015

Round 3 
January 24, 2016

Round 4 
February 21, 2016

Round 5 
March 20, 2016

Round 6 
April 17, 2016

Round 7 
May 22, 2016

Rank

AGA City League A 2017
The matches took place across 4 divisions (A to D), between November 13, 2016, and May 21, 2017.

Roster

Round 1 
November 13, 2016

Round 2 
December 4, 2016

Round 3 
January 22, 2017

Round 4 
February 19, 2017

Round 5 
March 19, 2017

Round 6 
April 23, 2017

Round 7 
May 21, 2017

Rank

AGA City League A 2018
AGA City League 2018 is played between December 10, 2017, and June 10, 2018.

Roster

Round 1 
December 10, 2017

Round 2 
January 21, 2018

Round 3 
February 18, 2018

Round 4 
March 18, 2018

Round 5 
April 22, 2018

Round 6 
May 20, 2018

Round 7 
June 10, 2018

Scoreboard

Final
July 21, 2018. Williamsburg, VA

AGA City League A 2019
AGA City League 2019 was played between November 18, 2018, and May 19, 2019.

Roster

Round 1
November 18, 2018

Round 2
December 9, 2018

Round 3
January 20, 2019

Round 4
February 17, 2019

Round 5
March 17, 2019

Round 6
April 14, 2019

Round 7
May 19, 2019

Scoreboard

face-to-face final

AGA City League A 2020
AGA City League 2020 was played between November 17, 2019, and May 17, 2020.

Roster

Round 1
November 17, 2019

Round 2
December 8, 2019

Round 3
January 19, 2020

Round 4
February 16, 2020

Round 5
March 15, 2020

Round 6
April 19, 2020

Round 7
May 17, 2020

AGA City League 2021
AGA City League 2021 is played between December 6, 2020, and May 23, 2021.

AGA City League A 2021

Roster

Round 1
December 6, 2020

Round 2
January 10, 2021

Round 3
January 31, 2021

Round 4
February 21, 2021

Round 5
March 21, 2021

Round 6
April 18, 2021

Round 7
May 23, 2021

AGA City League B 2021

Roster

Round 1
December 6, 2020

Round 2
January 10, 2021

Round 3
January 31, 2021

Round 4
February 21, 2021

Round 5
March 21, 2021

Round 6
April 18, 2021

Round 7
May 23, 2021

AGA City League A 2022
AGA City League 2022 was played between January 9, 2022 and June 12, 2020.

Roster

Round 1
January 09, 2022

Round 2
January 30, 2022

Round 3
February 27, 2022

Round 4
March 20, 2022

Round 5
April 24, 2022

Round 6
May 15, 2022

Round 7
June 12, 2022

AGA City League 2023
AGA City League 2023 is played between January 8 2023 and June 4 2023.

Round 1
January 8, 2023

League A

League B

Round 2
January 29 2023

League A

League B

References

Go competitions in North America